Murray Harold Blumenfeld (October 15, 1923 – November 1, 2014) was an American classical composer. He wrote over thirty musical compositions. He was also a conductor, a music critic, and an educator, having taught in the Washington University in St. Louis music department for almost thirty years.

Biography
Blumenfeld was born in Seattle, Washington, to Herman and Margaret "Peg" Blumenfeld. He was the eldest of three children. His family traveled widely, especially during the Depression, when his father sought work in retail. Near the end of his high school years, the family settled in St. Louis. Blumenfeld was educated at the Eastman School of Music (1941–43), where he studied with Bernard Rogers, but his studies there were interrupted by World War II. He later earned the Bachelor of Music degree at Yale University in 1948 and the Master of Music in 1949. His primary mentor at Yale was Paul Hindemith. He studied at the University of Zurich in 1948. During the summers of 1949-52 he attended Tanglewood Music Center, where he trained as a conductor with Robert Shaw, Leonard Bernstein, and Boris Goldovsky.

Blumenfeld was director of Opera Theater in St. Louis from 1962 to 1966. He directed Washington University Opera Studio from 1960 to 1971.

One of his students at Washington University was African American composer John Elwood Price.

Works and bibliography

Musical compositions

Songs and song cycles
Eroscapes (text: Isabella Tate Gardner), for chamber ensemble (Mezzo-Soprano Solo, Flute, Oboe, Clarinet, Bassoon, Horn, Violin, Viola, Cello), published by MMB Music Inc (MU.X081028)
Songs of War (text: Siegfried Sassoon), SATB chorus a cappella (1971)
Songs of Innocence (text: William Blake), double mixed chorus, with mezzo-soprano and tenor soli and orchestra (1972-1973)
Elegy for the nightingale, (text: Matthew Arnold), baritone, chorus, orchestra (1975)
Rilke for Voice and Guitar, recorded by Turnabout TV, 1978; and Vox Box CDX 5145, 1995
Voyages (text: Hart Crane) (1978)
Circle of The Eye: Eleven Poems by Tom McKeown for Medium Voice & Piano, published by King's Crown Music Press, 1982
Diluvial from Illuminations, Symphonic Fragments after Rimbaud for Orchestra (1992), published by MMB Music, Inc., 1992
Mythologies (text: Derek Walcott) (2001)
Sterne und Stein, three songs after Rudolf Gelpke (2003)
Songs of Cassis (2004)
Oak, Feather, and Stone: To Friends Past and Present, Medium Voice and Piano (2004)

Music for piano and other works
Transformations: expansion fugues for piano (1963), published by Seesaw Music, 1971
Expansions, for woodwind quintet, published by MMB Music, Inc., 1970

Operas
Amphitryon 4 (1963)
Gentle Boy (1968), based on a story by Nathaniel Hawthorne
The Road to Salem (1969)
Breakfast Waltzes: bagatelle opera in one act (1988)
Fourscore: an opera of opposites (1989)
Seasons in hell: The lives of Arthur Rimbaud : opera in two acts, published by MMB Music, Inc., 1996
Borgia Infami: Opera in Two Acts (2002)

Writing and translations

Prose
"Two Articles on Opera" (1952)
"A Controversial Look at a Controversial Genius," Los Angeles Times, September 22, 1974. (On Arnold Schoenberg)

Translations
Leoncavallo, Ruggero, I pagliacci: two acts (1955)
Praetorius, Michael, The Syntagma Musicum of Michael Praetorius: Volume Two: De Organographia, First and Second Parts, Barenreiter Verlag, 1949, 1962; Da Capo, 1975.

Bibliography
S. Jenkins, Jr.: "Waiting at the Gateway," Opera News, xxxii/26 (1968), 19
J. Wierzbicki: "Blumenfeld’s Music," St. Louis Globe-Democrat (Feb 3–4, 1979)

Honors and awards
 American Academy and Institute of Arts and Letters (1977)
 National Endowment for the Arts (1979)

References

External links
 Harold Blumenthal Papers, Washington University Special Collections
 Sound recording: Carnet de Damne
 Sound recording: La Face Cendree
 Sound recording: Illuminations: Symphonic Fragments after Rimbaud: I. Meadows of Emerald and Iron
 Sound recording: Illuminations: Symphonic Fragments after Rimbaud: II. Diluvial
 Interview with Harold Blumenfeld, July 16, 1988

1923 births
2014 deaths
20th-century classical composers
20th-century American conductors (music)
20th-century classical pianists
American classical pianists
Male classical pianists
American male pianists
American male conductors (music)
Jewish American classical composers
Jewish classical composers
Jewish classical pianists
Yale School of Music alumni
Washington University in St. Louis faculty
Musicians from Seattle
20th-century American pianists
20th-century American composers
20th-century American male musicians